Amloh Assembly constituency (Sl. No.: 56) is a Punjab Legislative Assembly constituency in Fatehgarh Sahib district, Punjab state, India.

Members of the Legislative Assembly

Election results

2022

2017

Prev. Results

References

External links
  

Assembly constituencies of Punjab, India
Fatehgarh Sahib district